Ankit Chadha (21 December 1987 – 9 May 2018) was an Indian writer, story-teller, oral narrative performance artist, researcher and educator. He specialized in research-based narratives performed in the centuries-old Dastangoi form of storytelling. His writing varied from biographical accounts of personalities like Kabir and Rahim to Dara Shikoh and Majaz. He had spoken on Dastangoi globally, including at Harvard, Yale and University of Toronto. 

Ankit had worked with non-profits to weave modern tales on sustainability, technology and hunger. Additionally, Ankit had innovated the form of 'Musical Dastan', uniquely bringing together stories and music. Ankit had also worked on Dastangoi performances for children, adapting classics including Alice, The Phantom Tollbooth, and The Little Prince. He was the author of the award-winning books "Amir Khusrau - The Man in Riddles" and “My Gandhi Story”.

His latest book, “Toh Hazireen Hua Yun.. Dastan-e-Ankit Chadha”, tells Ankit's story through his work. It is a collection of 16 Dastans written and performed by him over the last seven years. The book includes ‘Praarthanaa’, a musical dastan which is based on Ankit's years of continuing research on the Collected Works of Mahatma Gandhi. Undeniably, this dastan was very close to Ankit's heart and was the last dastan completed and performed by him.

Early life and education 
Ankit was born in New Delhi to a middle-class family. He did his schooling from Tagore International School and Cambridge School. He went on to pursue his love for History at Hindu College, Delhi University. This is where he also pursued his other love for dramatics. He was the president at Ibtida, the dramatics society of Hindu College.

Career 
Ankit spent 4 years (2008 – 2012) working in the corporate world in the digital marketing space before he found his calling for Storytelling.

Under the mentorship of Mahmood Farooqui, he learnt the art of Urdu storytelling known as dastangoi, an oral form that revolves around the dastango or storyteller, using their voice to conjure up an elaborate cast of characters, transporting audiences to distant worlds and making them think about their own immediate reality. In 2012, he also delivered a talk at TEDx on Dastangoi.

After he perfected what his ustaad had taught him, Ankit began to boldly experiment with the form to create new stories from his wide reading and fierce curiosity. He went wherever his heart led him, and collaborations rapidly shaped up with singers, scholars and storytellers. 

He experimented with scripting on contemporary themes like mobile ecosystem, corporate culture, digital divide and nomadic pastoralism in dastangoi. He performed at major festivals in India including Old World Theatre Fest (Delhi), Repertwahr Fest (Lucknow), Sunday to Sunday Theatre Fest (Ahmedabad), and Kabir Fest (Mumbai). He was also a speaker/performer on Children's literature at the Jaipur Litfest; Bookaroo, Srinagar; Kahaani Festival.

While Ankit received tremendous media attention for his capacity to hold audiences spellbound, his work as a peace educator merits more visibility. In 2013, he was selected by Seeds of Peace, a peace building and leadership development organisation in the US, to participate in a two-week programme for educators called ‘Making History’. His association with the organisation deepened further, and he was part of a follow-up programme in Jordan. On that trip, he also visited Jerusalem, and came back with stories that had seeped under his skin. He was later awarded the New Visions for Peace Fellowship, which took him to Cyprus. Ankit was in the process of developing Project Agora, which would explore how history can be taught through creative means that encourage critical thinking.

Performances 
Praarthanaa - a musical dastan celebrating 'Death' in the life and thought of Gandhi
Dastan Dhai Aakhar Ki - a dastangoi presentation on Kabir
 Dastan-e-Khanabadosh - a dastangoi presentation about nomadic pastoralists
 Dastan Khusrav-e-Shireen Sukhan Ki
Dastan-e-Amir Hamza
 Dastan Tollbooth Ki
 Dastan Dara Shikoh Ki
 Dastan Khan-e-Khanan Ki - with Himanshu Bajpai
 Dastan Urdu Mahathagni Ki
 Dastan-e-Aawaargi - with Himanshu Bajpai
 Dastan Fox Aur Dog Ki - a dastangoi presentation on Digital India
 Dastan Bhookh Ki
 Kissa Cheenti Ka
 Dastan Jaal Ke Khel Ki Aur Khel Ke Jaal Ki - a dastangoi presentation on Mobile technology
Durga Saptashati
 Dastan-e-sedition - presented along with Himanshu Bajpai during the 2016 student protests at Jawaharlal Nehru University, New Delhi.
 Dastan Alice ki - Alice's Adventures in Wonderland by Lewis Carroll, adopted in dastangoi form

Publications 
Toh Hazireen Hua Yun... Dastan-e-Ankit Chadha - A collection of dastans woven by Ankit Chadha
Amir Khusrau : The Man in Riddles - The Riddles of Amir Khusrau adapted for children
 My Gandhi Story

Other projects 
Teaching CCC Electives Course on Storytelling at MICA
History Educator at Seeds of Peace: Ankit was invited by Seeds of Peace, US-based not-for-profit as one of the 2 representatives from India among 8 countries to address key questions that are at the heart of education for a more peaceful future. Given the central role that the construction and teaching of history plays in conflict settings, this program focuses on the topic of “Making History.”
Consultant to Aga Khan Foundation: Ankit wrote and performed Dastan Khusrav-e-Shireen Sukhan Ki, a dastangoi presentation on the life, times and works of the phenomenon called Amir Khusrau. He devised, scripted and performed a musical narrative exploring the relationship between Amir Khusrau, the 13th century Sufi poet from India, and his spiritual master Nizamuddin Auliya. He also edited scholarly papers on various topics written by academics around the world on Amir Khusrau, and translated qawwali kalaams from Urdu to English.
Visiting Fellow at Jadavpur University: Ankit conducted workshop with students (of undergraduate till M.Phil) from Departments of Comparative Literature and English, Jadavpur University, to understand the art of Dastangoi (from concept to delivery) and experience how working on a Dastan around a poet enriches one's enjoyment of his/her poetry.
New Visions of Peace Fellowship: As an artist with an educational mission, Ankit worked on a project to build a more peaceful future in communities affected by conflict, by encouraging cross-cultural understanding.
Story Development for Animation Film on Bhil Art: We Make Images is an animated interpretation of an origin myth from the Bhil community in Madhya Pradesh, India. For the Bhil community, painting is like offering a prayer and the film reveals why. The film is a collaboration between the indigenous artist Sher Singh from the community and the film maker Nina Sabnani that explores ways of telling together.
Story on the Markets of Lucknow: The project was for the Mahindra Sanatkada Festival 2013, with its theme as "Lucknow Ke Bazaaron Mein Chahal Qadami". A customized narrative was woven to acquaint the audience with all the 56 shops set up in the Safed Baradari to recreate the 18th century bazaar. The research, compilation, and writing for the piece was done in collaboration with Mahmood Farooqui.
Workshops for State Council of Educational Research and Training (SCERT): Ankit trained teachers in the incorporation of storytelling as a technique in daily classroom learning. Some of the objectives were improving reading ability, and integrating curriculum with stories.
"Tum Chalo" Promo for NH7 Weekender: The project involved writing the script for the official trailer of the India's leading music festival.

Awards and honours
 Sep 2017: 37th FIP Award for Excellence in Book Production for "Amir Khusrau: The Man in Riddles"
 Apr 2017: Inaugural Sabarmati Fellowship by Sabarmati Ashram Preservation and Memorial Trust
 2016: Children's Choice Award 2016 for “My Gandhi Story”, by Young India Books
 Feb 2014: Darsana National Award For Excellence in Book Production for "My Gandhi Story"
 Nov 2013: Best Script and Best Overall Production for “Dastan Ek Chhoti Si Cheenti Ki”, by Short and Sweet Theatre Festival 2013
 July 2012: Best Live Tweeting for the Event for the best quality coverage on Twitter, by Digital Empowerment Foundation
 Jan 2012: Nominated for India Digital Award for Best Social Media Marketing Campaign and Best Digital Integrated Campaign, by Internet And Mobile Association of India

Death
He drowned in a lake near Pune, Maharashtra on May 9, 2018.  

As mentioned in a statement released by the Kabir Festival Mumbai, “Ankit was out for a walk near Kamshet lake, outside Pune, when he and his friend slipped and fell into the water. His friend managed to get to safety and scream for help, bringing local villagers to the spot. Since it was past sunset, it was difficult to locate him in the dark water. When they did manage to retrieve him two hours later, it was too late.”

References

Sadness, Shock: Storyteller Ankit Chadha’s Friends Mourn His Death 
नहीं रहे युवा दास्तानगो अंकित चड्ढा
DELHI STORYTELLER ANKIT CHADHA DROWNS IN LAKE NEAR KAMSHET
Dastango Ankit Chadha Dies in Drowning Incident, Cremated in Delhi
Gone too soon
Delhi storyteller and dastangoi exponent drowns in lake near Pune

1987 births
2018 deaths
Indian writers
People from Pune
Delhi University alumni